(), or Route 88, is a road in north-east Iceland. The road heads south from Route 1, a ring road, close to the volcanic crater  , to Route 910, not far from Askja.

References

External links

 Current condition of Icelandic roads

Roads in Iceland